Balgo may refer to:
 Australia
 Balgo, Western Australia

Burkina Faso
 Balgo, Baskouré, a village in the Baskouré Department of Kouritenga Province
 Balgo, Yargo, a village in the Yargo Department of Kouritenga Province

Sweden
 Balgö, an island and nature reserve in the Kattegat